Sanionia is a genus of mosses belonging to the family Amblystegiaceae.

The genus has cosmopolitan distribution, and was circumscribed by Leopold Loeske in Verh. Bot. Vereins. Prov. Brandenburg vol.49 on page 63 in 1907.

The genus is named after Karl Gustav Sanio (1832–1891).

Species
 Sanionia fertilis 
 Sanionia georgicouncinata 
 Sanionia nivalis 
 Sanionia uncinata

References

Amblystegiaceae
Moss genera